Dolphins Barn Jewish Cemetery was established in 1898 by Robert Bradlaw a dentist and prominent member of Dublin's Jewish community who raised £300 in donations to set up a new chevra kadisha. and the Dublin Jewish Holy Burial Society (HBS), founded in 1884 and dedicated to financier and philanthropist Sir Moses Montefiore. It replaced Ballybough Cemetery, Fairview, as the principal Jewish cemetery in Dublin, and close to the south circular road area, where a large number of jews lived. There is also a prayer room on the site. With Dolphins barn being the Orthodox cemetery, there is also a Progressive Jewish Cemetery, Woodtown Cemetery, on Oldcourt Road, Rathfarnham, established in 1952.

Burials

The earliest burial is that of Ze'ev, son of Gedaliya Levi Goldring, who died 6 September 1898. It contains one Commonwealth grave from World War II that of  Flight Lieutenant [Pilot] Maurice Donald Khan. The cemetery founder Robert Bradlaw is buried also here.

References

Ashkenazi Jewish culture in Ireland
Cemeteries in Dublin (city)
Jews and Judaism in Dublin (city)
Jewish cemeteries
Jewish Irish history